Barbadian (or Bajan) Americans are Americans of Barbados heritage or ancestry. The 2000 Census recorded 53,785 US residents born on the Caribbean island 52,170 of whom were born to non-American parents and 54,509 people who described their ethnicity as Barbadian. The 2010 US Census estimation report stated more than 62,000 Barbadian Americans are resident in the United States, most of whom are in the area of New York City extending from Rhode Island to Delaware. In past years, some also moved to the areas of Chicago, Illinois, and Boston, Massachusetts.

History
Barbadians were sent to Carolina as slaves. The first West Indians brought to the United States were forced laborers from Barbados, who were transferred to South Carolina in the 1670s to work on plantations. Slaves from Barbados became a significant part of the black population in Virginia, mainly in the tidewater region of the Chesapeake Bay.

Settlement patterns

A majority of Barbadian immigrants tend to live in Philadelphia esp. in the North Philadelphia and the West Philadelphia sections. Barbadians along with other various Caribbean Americans follow the agricultural and even more in the landscaping, construction, domestics and hospitality industries of both Florida and urban industrial areas of the Northeast Corridor or Eastern Seaboard. In the 2000s, an estimated 100,000 Barbadian Americans had residences in each of the areas of New York and Philadelphia .

Barbadians are concentrated in East Flatbush, Brooklyn, and surrounding neighborhoods in New York City.

Politics and government 
Eric Holder, the 82nd United States Attorney General, has roots in Barbados. His father Eric Himpton Holder, Sr. (1905–1970) was born in St. Joseph, Barbados. His mother Miriam's birth occurred in New Jersey to parents who were immigrants from Saint Philip, Barbados.

The Barbados government also maintains diplomatic and consular representation in a handful of American cities and towns.  These include an Embassy in Washington, D.C., two Consulates-General in: Miami, New York City; a Permanent Mission to the United Nations in New York City; and is also further supported by a collection of Honorary Consulates in: Atlanta, Boston, Denver, Detroit, Houston, Los Angeles, Louisville, New Orleans, Portland, San Francisco, and Toledo.

Notable people

See also

Barbados – United States relations
West Indian Americans
Caribbean immigration to New York City

References

Further reading
 Mulraine, Lloyd E. "Barbadian Americans." Gale Encyclopedia of Multicultural America, edited by Thomas Riggs, (3rd ed., vol. 1, Gale, 2014), pp. 237–249. online

External links
  Council of Barbadian Organizations Inc. New York

Caribbean American
Americans
Americans